Polar the Titanic Bear is a children's book written by Margaretta "Daisy" Corning Spedden (née Stone) (19 November 1872 – 10 February 1950). Spedden was an American heiress who survived the sinking of the Titanic, and her account of her family's trip and the eventual disaster, written as a tale to amuse her seven-year-old son, was published about 45 years after her death. The story is told from the point of view of a Teddy Bear.

How the story was written 
Spedden was born in Morristown, New Jersey and lived with her husband Frederic and son Douglas in Tuxedo Park, New York. The family traveled frequently, and she kept detailed diaries of the trips.

In April, 1912, the Speddens booked passage on the Titanic.  After the ship sank, Daisy was rescued by the RMS Carpathia.  All members of the Spedden entourage survived the disaster.
The next year, Spedden wrote and illustrated a book which told the story of the trip, sinking, and rescue from the point of view of Douglas' Teddy Bear. She gave the storybook to Douglas as a Christmas present.  Two years later, Douglas was killed in an automobile accident. Daisy died February 10, 1950, and the storybook remained among the family possessions for the next forty years.

Publication 
After many years, the storybook was found in a trunk by Leighton H. Coleman III, a relative of Spedden's, and he decided to have it published. The story was edited by Hugh Brewster of Madison Books in Toronto, Ontario, and Canadian artist Laurie McGaw was chosen to illustrate the book in watercolours.  Coleman wrote an introduction explaining how the story came about. Some of Spedden's photographs and pictures of Titanic souvenirs were also used as illustrations. Madison Books published the first edition in 1994.

Editions:
Madison Books, 1994
Little Brown and Company, 1994, 2001..
Scholastic Books, 1998
Hodder Headline, 1998
Rebound by Sagebrush, 2001.

The book has been translated into German, Spanish, Dutch and Japanese.

Awards 
Polar the Titanic Bear has won a number of awards for children's literature, including:  
Silver Birch Award of the Ontario Library Association
1998 BILBY Award (Young Readers Category) (Australia)
Society of School Librarians' Award for International Best Book for K-6
Finalist for the 1994 Governor General's Award (Canada), for Laurie McGaw's illustrations
1995 - Children's Choice Award

See also 

1994 Governor General's Awards

References

External links 
Polar, The Titanic Bear web site
 

1995 books
American children's books
Teddy bears
Books based on actual events
Books about bears
Works about RMS Titanic
American memoirs